A number of monuments and memorials in Canada were removed as a result of protests between 2020 and 2022. These included six sculptures of Sir John A. Macdonald, the first prime minister of Canada, three of other figures connected to the Canadian Indian residential school system (Alexander Wood, Egerton Ryerson and Joseph Hugonard), two of British monarchs (Queen Victoria and Elizabeth II), one of the British explorer Captain James Cook and one of John Deighton ("Gassy Jack"), a bar-owner whose nickname inspired the name of Vancouver's Gastown district.

The initial protests in 2020 occurred in the context of the worldwide George Floyd protests, which resulted in the widespread removal of monuments and memorials connected to systemic racism. In the spring of 2021, unmarked graves were discovered at the sites of several former residential schools.

List
{| class="wikitable sortable" style="text-align:left"
! colspan="2" | Monument/memorial
! Location
! Province
! Removal announced
! Removed
! Means of removal
! class="unsortable" | Notes
! class="unsortable" | 
|-

See also
 
 George Floyd protests in Canada
 List of monuments and memorials removed during the George Floyd protests

References

2020 in Canada
2021 in Canada
2022 in Canada
Controversies in Canada
John A. Macdonald
Lists of monuments and memorials in Canada
Monuments and memorials removed during the George Floyd protests
Sculptures in Canada
2020-2022